Motrić (Serbian Cyrillic: Мотрић) is a village in Central Serbia (Šumadija), in the municipality of Rekovac (Region of Levač), lying at , at the elevation of 350 m. According to the 2002 census, the village had 175 citizens.

External links
 Levac Online
 Article about Motrić
 Pictures from Motrić

Populated places in Pomoravlje District
Šumadija